Avicenna Tajik State Medical University or ATSMU is a public university in Tajikistan. Established in 1939, it is located in Dushanbe and named after the Persian polymath Abuali Ibni Sino (also spelled Avicenna). It is managed by the Ministry of Health and is the only higher medical education facility in Tajikistan preparing medical personnel for the country.

History
Since its establishment in 1939, the medical university has educated more than 35,000 highly skilled medical personnel working not only inside the country, but abroad as well.

One of the primary goals of the university is to adjust the national system of medical education - structures, contents, terms and quality to the both international standards and requirements to the quality of a professional training, that will allow Tajikistan to join the world community of medical education and provide the development of the international cooperation in the field of training and advancing the professional skill of the medical staff. The university successfully proceeds on a direction of improving the quality of the public standard of the medical education and the development of new curricula and programs according to the requirements of the World Federation for Medical Education. Great attention is being paid to the constant improvement of the quality of medical education, and the quality of training the medical staff on a whole.

Academic profile
University is considered a key scientific-methodical base of the Ministry of Health of the Republic, and the majority of achievements in the sphere of public health services of the country are directly connected with the activity of its professors. Each year the staff of the university carries out over 15,000 surgical operations and over 45,000 remedial and consultative actions that makes about 60% of all medical interventions to be carried out in the healthcare facilities of the city of Dushanbe.

Structure

Centers 

 Center Learning of Practical Skills
 Center of Pre-University Training
 Treatment and Diagnostic Center
 Center of Education, Science and Production “Farmacia”
 Centre of Strategic Development and Management

Faculties 
The structure of the university has 5 faculties:

 Medical
 Pediatrics
 Dentistry
 Pharmacy
 Public Health

Departments 

 Department of Obstetrics and Gynecology No. 1
 Department of Obstetrics and Gynecology No. 2
 Department of Operative Surgery and Topographic Anatomy
 Department of Human anatomy named after Y.A.Rakhimova
 Department of Pathological Anatomy
 Department of Anesthesiology and Resuscitation
 Department of Neurology and Medical Genetic Basis
 Department of Internal Diseases No. 1
 Department of Internal Diseases No. 2
 Department of Internal Diseases No. 3
 Department of Pediatrics No. 1
 Department of Pediatrics No. 2
 Department of Infectious Diseases
 Department of Pediatrics Infectious Diseases
 Department of Surgical Diseases No. 1
 Department of Surgical Diseases No. 2
 Department of Environmental health
 Department of General Hygiene and Ecology
 Department of Biology with Genetic Basis
 Department of Biochemistry
 Department of Physiotherapy and Oriental Medicine
 Department of Histology
 Department of Dermatovenereology
 Department of Tajik language
 Department of Foreign Languages
 Department of Bioorganic and Physicolloid Chemistry
 Department of Pharmaceutical and Toxicological Chemistry
 Department of Microbiology, Immunology and Virology
 Department of Oncology, Radiology and Radiotherapy
 Department of Otorhinolaryngology
 Department of Ophthalmology
 Department of Psychiatry and Narcology named after Professor M.G. Gulomov
 Department of Children's Dentistry and Orthodontics
 Department of Therapeutic Dentistry
 Department of Orthopedic Dentistry
 Department of Public Health and Medical Statistics with a course in the History of Medicine
 Department of Valeology and Physical Training
 Department of Propaedeutics of Internal Diseases
 Department of propaedeutics of children diseases
 Department of Pharmaceutical Technology
 Department of Family Medicine No. 1
 Department of Family Medicine No. 2
 Department of Forensic Medicine
 Department of Military Medicine
 Department of Traumatology, Orthopedics and Military Field Surgery
 Department of Urology
 Department of Social Disciplines
 Department of Pharmacognosy and Organization of Pharmacy Economics
 Department of Pharmacology
 Department of Medical and Biological Physics with Information Technology Basis
 Department of Normal Physiology
 Department of Pathological Physiology
 Department of Phthisiopulmonology
 Department of Neurosurgery and mixed Injuries
 Department of Innovative Surgery and Transplantology
 Department of Pediatric Surgery
 Department of General Surgery No. 1
 Department of General Surgery No. 2
 Department of Oral and Maxillofacial Surgery
 Department of Endocrinology
 Department of Epidemiology

Campus
The library fund of the university consists of 680,334 items of educational, medical and scientific literature, including 151,100 electronic books. The university has the well equipped electronic library, connected to the Internet, accessible to all beneficiaries. Taking into consideration the available resources and a spectrum of opportunities, the university library is considered to be the best specialized medical library in the country.

During the last years the capacity of the university was strengthened by opening various resources, scientific and clinical centers, such as Stem Cells Laboratory, Evidence-based Medicine Centre, Drug Information Centre, Educational-clinical Centre "Stomatology", Diagnostic and Treatment Centre, Clinical Skills Centre etc. Some centers and the laboratories working within framework of the ATSMU are unique in the republic, and provide methodological support to scientific and medical establishments at the national level.

International cooperation
ATSMU is included in the catalogue of the Foundation for Advancement of International Medical Education and Research (FAIMER), the Educational Commission for Foreign Medical Graduates (ECFMG) and the Directory of the Medical Universities of the World Health Organization. The improvement of the quality of education and advancement of the level of training of the medical staff for the system of public health of the country is the priority goal of the management of the university. To attain this goal the experience of the best foreign medical educational institutions and also all existing real opportunities of the university itself are adopted.

The important directions of university activity is promotion of international cooperation, which facilitates improvement of the quality of curriculums, development of all-round and effective relations with medical institutions, high schools, the foreign research centers. Thus currently University has cooperation links with over 80 scientific - educational institutions of Canada, Austria, France, Germany, Sweden, Poland, China, Iran, Afghanistan, Russia, Ukraine, Kazakhstan, as well as successful joint projects with WHO, SDC, USAID, GIZ, Global Fund, Soros Foundation, DAAD, TEMPUS, ISTC, UNFPA that contributes to the development of all-round cooperation with foreign partners.

Rectors 
The leaders of the institute were:
Adolf Kraus (1939-1942)
K. Romadonovsky (1942)
A. Prokopchuk (1942)
G. Skosogorenko (1942—1944)
D. Khveiseni (1944-1947)
Lev Sutulov (1947-1950)
Y. Rakhimov (1950-1957)
Z. Khodzhayev (1957-1965)
K. Tadzhiev (1965-1973)
Y. Iskhaki (1973–1996)
H. Rofiev (1996-1999)
N. Fayzulloev (2000–2003)
K. Kurbonov (2003–2005)
Gulzoda Makhmadshoh Kurbonali (2016–Present)

See also
List of hospitals in Tajikistan (Affiliated International Ibn Sina Clinic)

References 

Universities in Tajikistan
Medical and health organisations based in Tajikistan
Educational institutions established in 1939
Education in Dushanbe
1939 establishments in the Soviet Union
Avicenna